The American Philatelic Society (APS) is the largest nonprofit stamp collecting foundation of philately in the world. Both the membership and interests of the society are worldwide.

History
The organization, originally named the American Philatelic Association, was established on September 14, 1886 in New York City, and the following day elected John K. Tiffany as its first president. Voting membership was granted to 219 individuals who paid two bits (25¢) for the privilege. The organization's name was changed to its present name for a few months in 1897, then back, then permanently in 1908.

Society membership reached over 4,000 in 1940, and included U.S. President Franklin D. Roosevelt and his Secretary of the Interior Harold L. Ickes. At the 1942 APS convention, board member Donald Lybarger argued for the creation of a central office near the geographic center of the philatelic community, but not in a large city. When he was elected APS President in 1943, he was able to turn his vision into reality. At the 1944 APS convention it was announced that the APS would accept applications for the position of Executive Secretary.  H. Clay Musser of State College, Pennsylvania, was selected and the APS office was established there on April 1, 1945. As a testament to their leadership, the APS became the US representative to the Federation Internationale de Philatelie in 1947.

By the mid-1990s, the expanded services, staff and the American Philatelic Research Library had outgrown the facility in State College. A study determined that because of high local real estate values, it was not cost effective to expand the existing building. A search of alternatives identified a property ten miles (sixteen kilometers) from State College that was basically sound and could be acquired for a reasonable amount. In 2002, after much discussion, debate and soul searching, the APS committed millions of dollars to purchasing and renovating what was known as the Match Factory in Bellefonte, Pennsylvania. The American Philatelic Center was dedicated in June, 2004.

Philatelic services

The APS offers several services to its members:
 The American Philatelist - monthly magazine
 StampStore - online stamp buying
 member sales circuits via mail
 American Philatelic Research Library
 Insurance for stamp collections
 American Philatelic Expertizing Service
 Accreditation of Judges and National Exhibitions
 Educational opportunities
 Member Code of Ethics and a Complaint Process
 APS Stamp Talk with Nancy Clark on internet radio talk station wsRadio.

Members
APS membership includes over 600 commercial stamp dealers and about 450 local stamp clubs. In addition, nearly 200 specialty societies are affiliated with the APS.
Individual membership reached a high of 57,000 in 1991, and stands at just over 28,000 as of June 2018.

Events
The organization has two national events each year: APS AmeriStamp Expo is held each Winter and APS StampShow is scheduled in the Summer. Both shows rotate to different locations around the country. The Summer event is the largest annual national show with 150 dealers, 10,000 pages of exhibits, meetings of more than 25 national societies, and over 100 educational seminars. Local stamp clubs host smaller shows, some several times each year.

According to the ARIPEX website, its 61st annual show to be held 15–17 February 2019 in Mesa, AZ, will be "the last winter show conducted by the APS."

Honors and awards
The society honors those who serve notably in the field of philately. The American Philatelic Society Hall of Fame honors those now-deceased philatelists who have served philately. In addition the society honors living distinguished philatelists for their contributions to the field with the Luff Award.

Controversy
Around 1970, numerous newly independent countries realized that issuing stamps was an excellent source of revenue. Because the stamps were sent to other countries, there was little risk of the stamps actually being used for postage. Historically, a country issued stamps to commemorate an event or honor a national figure, but these new nations created stamps that appealed to popular collecting themes, such as Disney figures, airplanes or space, famous people in the world. Instead of releasing a single stamp, they would create a set, with values ranging from a penny to five dollars. The APS was appalled, and created the “black blot” program. The society published a monthly magazine for members, and began to include a list of new stamp issues that were judged to be overpriced or unnecessary.  A country with high illiteracy and a marginal postal service did not require 100 different stamps each year.  However, many collectors rebelled at being told to reject some stamps, and the program was eventually dropped.

References

External links 
 
 APS Tips and Links

 
1886 establishments in the United States
Non-profit organizations based in Pennsylvania
Organizations established in 1886
Nonprofit hobbyist organizations based in the United States